Hits and Assorted Secrets 1984–1993 is a Greatest Hits album by The Northern Pikes released in 1999. Along with some of the band's biggest hits, the album included 3 previously unreleased tracks.

Following the tour in support of Neptune in 1993, the band decided to dissolve. However, in 1999 Virgin Records asked the band members for their input on a "greatest hits" package. To support the package, the band decided to do a short promotional tour. They found themselves enjoying the more relaxed independence of making their own schedule that they continued touring.

Track listing

"Teenland"
"Things I Do for Money" (radio edit)
"Place That's Insane"
"Hopes Go Astray"
"Let's Pretend"
"Wait for Me" (radio edit)
"She Ain't Pretty" (radio edit)
"Kiss Me You Fool"
"Dream Away" (Stasium Re-mix)
"Girl With a Problem"
"Wasting Away" (previously unreleased)
"What She Wants" (previously unreleased)
"Beautiful Summer" (previously unreleased)
"Chain of Flowers" (edit)
"Believe"
"Worlds Away"
"Unimportant" (live)
"Dancing in a Dance Club" (live) (edit)

Song notes
Tracks 1–2 from Big Blue Sky (1987)
Tracks 3–6 from Secrets of the Alibi (1988)
Tracks 7–10 from Snow in June (1990)
Tracks 11–13 are previously unreleased
Tracks 14–16 from Neptune (1992)
Tracks 17–18 from Gig (1993)

Album credits

Personnel
Jay Semko – vocals, bass
Merl Bryck – vocals, guitar
Bryan Potvin – vocals, guitar
Don Schmid – drums, percussion

Additional Personnel
Rick Hutt – piano, keyboards on track 3–6
Ross Nykiforuk – keyboards on tracks 14–18
Greg Johns – mellotron on track 15
Margo Timmins – vocals on track 16

References
 Liner notes from The Northern Pikes:Hits and Assorted Secrets 1984-1993.

The Northern Pikes albums
1999 greatest hits albums
Virgin Records compilation albums